The Fourth Oklahoma Legislature was a meeting of the legislative branch of the government of Oklahoma, composed of the Oklahoma Senate and the Oklahoma House of Representatives. The state legislature met in the India White Temple in Oklahoma City, in regular session from January 7 to March 17, 1913, and in special session from March 18 to July 5, 1913, during the term of Governor Lee Cruce.

The 1913 session was marked by the passage of a municipal Sunday closing law, which was favored by Cruce. Lieutenant Governor James Jackson McAlester served as the President of the Senate and C.B. Kendrick served as the President pro tempore of the Oklahoma Senate. J. H. Maxey served as Speaker of the Oklahoma House of Representatives.

Dates of sessions
Regular session: January 7-March 17, 1913
Special session: March 18-July 5, 1913
Previous: 3rd Legislature • Next: 5th Legislature

Party composition

Senate

House of Representatives

Major legislation
Sundays - Governor Lee Cruce supported municipal Sunday closing laws and the 1913 state legislature passed House Bill 50, which prohibited a number of Sunday activities.

Leadership

Senate
Lieutenant Governor James Jackson McAlester served as the President of the Senate, which gave him a tie-breaking vote and allowed him to serve as a presiding officer. C.B. Kendrick was elected by state senators to serve as the President pro tempore of the Oklahoma Senate, the primary presiding officer of the Oklahoma Senate.

House
J. H. Maxey of Muskogee, Oklahoma, served as Speaker of the Oklahoma House of Representatives in 1913 and Charles B. Emanuel served as Speaker Pro Tempore.

Members

Senate

Table based on state almanac.

House of Representatives

Table based on government database.

References

External links
Oklahoma Legislature
Oklahoma House of Representatives
Oklahoma Senate

Oklahoma legislative sessions
1913 in Oklahoma
1914 in Oklahoma
1913 U.S. legislative sessions
1914 U.S. legislative sessions